Neuroblastoma breakpoint family, member 3, also known as NBPF3, is a human gene of the neuroblastoma breakpoint family, which resides on chromosome 1 of the human genome. NBPF3 is located at 1p36.12, immediately upstream of genes ALPL and RAP1GAP.

Protein sequence 

The NBPF3 gene is 633 amino acids long and contains five DUF1220 domains, which are highlighted in the image below. DUF1220 domains are found in all other members of the neuroblastoma breakpoint family. The protein has a very repetitive structure, since, along with the remaining members of its protein family, it likely arose form segmental duplications on chromosome 1.

The domains are located at residues 236–298, 322–385, 394–460, 469–535, and 544–610.

The protein sequence is rich in three amino acids that are polar and negatively charged at physiological pH: glutamic acid, aspartic acid and glutamine. The isoelectric point of the protein is 4.21, the acidity of which may be attributed to the abundance of these amino acids.

Isoforms and sequence characteristics 

There are four known isoforms of the NPBF3 gene. While isoform 1 is the dominant form of the gene, each other isoform has unique changes to the protein sequence that may affect the structure, expression or function of the gene product:

These isoforms are represented in the following schematic, along with additional sequence characteristics which include Poly-Glu compositional biases and a potential coiled coil.

Function 

The function of the neuroblastoma breakpoint family proteins, including NPBF3, is not yet understood by the scientific community. Because of the repetitive composition of this family of genes as well as their amplification in primates, it has been suggested that the family is involved in cognitive development and the evolution of primates.

It has also been suggested that there is a connection between the neuroblastoma breakpoint family and oncogenesis. Due to the up-regulation of NBPF genes in some tumor tissues, proteins of this family have been hypothesized to be oncogenes. It has also been suggested that members of the neuroblastoma breakpoint family are tumor suppressor genes, due to a loss of heterozygosity in tumor tissue in the region of chromosome 1 where NBPF3 and other NBPF proteins are located.

Homology 

Orthologs of NBPF3 are found primarily in primate species, though orthologous sequences can be found in cow, horse, and dog species. There is no mouse ortholog of NPBF3.

NPBF3 has many human paralogs because it is a member of a gene family.

Both orthologs and paralogs of NBPF3 were found using the databases BLAT. and BLAST

Protein interactions 

NPBF3 interacts with three other proteins: C1orf19, ankyrin-1 (ANK1) and Ewing sarcoma breakpoint region 1 (EWSR1). It is not known how these proteins interact or what the product of these interactions may be.

References

Further reading

Human proteins